dachshund (dac) is a gene involved in the development of the arthropod compound eye which also plays a role in leg development. It is activated by the Distal-less (Dll) gene. 

Dachshund homologue (DACH1) regulates tumorigenesis in humans as a part of the Retinal Determination Gene Network (RDGN) complex, with cancer patients showing altered DACH1 expression. Its homologs form the SKI/SNO/DAC family.

References 

Arthropod morphology
Drosophila melanogaster genes